KLEG-CD, virtual channel 44 (UHF digital channel 28), is a low-power, Class A NewsNet-affiliated television station licensed to Dallas, Texas, United States. The station is owned by DV Broadcasting.

History
This station was first established in 1996 as K19BW on channel 19 (branded on-air as Canal 19) with a Spanish general entertainment format, consisting of cartoons, classic programs, movies, and sports. Then in February 1999, the station was airing news from CBS Telenoticias. The network's news programming was relegated to overnight hours where the station would usually sign off-the-air and slots where infomercials would run, thus making it a 24-hour TV station, instead of the daily 8AM-12AM programming operations. By September 1999, K19BW was moved to channel 44 to make way for CBS affiliate KTVT (channel 11)'s digital signal, then the station was rebranded K44FO. By September 2000, K44FO dropped the CBS Telenoticias affiliation upon the network's transition to Telemundo Internacional and became a flagship station of Luis de la Garza's TeleAmerica Spanish Network with a few original programs such as Foro 44. By March 15, 2001, the station was once again rebranded to KLEG-LP. Despite picking up the Mas Musica network temporarily, it has remained an affiliate of TeleAmerica.

In 2006, Una Vez Más Holdings acquired the station as KODF-LP's repeater for Azteca América, thus any and all TeleAmerica programming was eliminated. This arrangement continued on until KODF's analog shut-off on June 25, 2009, where KLEG continued to carry Azteca América programming. Una Vez Más has since acquired KLDT, becoming KAZD, with that station becoming an Azteca América affiliate. As a result, Azteca América programming was dropped from KLEG-LP on January 25, 2011. Una Vez Mas has returned this station to its original owner and it has gone dark for six months.

There were rumors that KLEG-LP would become the LATV affiliate for the Dallas-Fort Worth Metro (previously shown on KDAF-DT2). However, as of 2011, KAZD has acquired that affiliation as well on KAZD-DT4. The station returned to the air in July 2011 multiplexed with Spanish language VMAS on DT1, Indian comedy channel SAB on DT2, an audio-only station playing south Asian music on DT3 and a test pattern on DT4. On August 10, 2011, the station's call sign was changed to KLEG-LD, and again on April 23, 2013, to KLEG-CD.

The station is now is committed to serving the growing multicultural viewers living in the DFW metro area, with South Asian and East Asian programming, most of which has English subtitles.

Technical information

Subchannels
The station's digital signal is multiplexed:

Analog-to-digital conversion
KLEG-CD switched to digital as of December 2010 serving the Dallas/Fort Worth area.

References

KLEG-CD
Television channels and stations established in 1996
NewsNet affiliates
Diya TV affiliates